Image is the second studio album by Japanese rock band Luna Sea, released on May 21, 1992. It is their major label debut on MCA Victor, reached number nine on the Oricon Albums Chart, and charted for 14 weeks. In 2000, it was certified Platinum by the RIAJ for sales over 400,000.

Overview 
The album was supported by the Image or Real, its three date encore, and After the Image tours for a total of 25 shows and an accumulative audience of 28,500.

The song "Search For Reason" is re-recorded from their 1989 demo "Shade". "Vampire's Talk" was originally titled "Feeling", and "In Mind" was titled "Sinful Song". This recording of "Moon" is a longer, reworked version of the song from their debut album Luna Sea. Guitarist Sugizo cited "Wish" as one of the songs wherein he tried to replicate the "psychedelic feel of shoegaze bands" by using effects, "like playing fast with a wah-wah pedal, or using tape-echo and harmonizers. I couldn’t figure out how they did it, so I just made it into my own thing."

"Déjàvu" and "Wish" were both re-recorded by the band for the 2000 compilation album Period -the Best Selection-.

Image was remastered and re-released by Universal Music Group on December 5, 2007, it came with a DVD of the promotional video for "Déjàvu". This version reached number 189 on the Oricon chart.

"Déjàvu" was also covered by Mucc for the 2007 Luna Sea Memorial Cover Album -Re:birth-.

This album's version of "Moon" was covered by Masami Tsuchiya for the 2007 Luna Sea Memorial Cover Album -Re:birth-.

"Wish" was covered by Sid for the 2007 Luna Sea Memorial Cover Album -Re:birth-.

Luna Sea's first Lunatic X'Mas 2018 -Introduction to the 30th Anniversary- concert at Saitama Super Arena on December 22, 2018 was subtitled Image or Real after the album's 1992 tour. There they performed some songs that had not been played since the original tour.

Image and the band's seven other major label studio albums, up to Luv, were released on vinyl record for the first time on May 29, 2019.

Track listing 
All lyrics written by Ryuichi, except "Wish" by Ryuichi and J.

Personnel 
Luna Sea
Vocal: Ryuichi
Guitar, violin: Sugizo
Guitar: Inoran
Bass: J
Drums, percussion: Shinya

Additional performers
Chorus: Yurie Kokubu, Kaoru Akimoto
Chorus arrangement: Hidekazu Tokumitsu

Production
Producer and arranger: Luna Sea
Executive producers: Masatoshi Sakanoue (Sweet Child), Seiichiro Ishihara, Takafumi Muraki (Victor Invitation)
Supervisor: Hiroyuki Iwata
Director: Yoshiyuki Maki, Akira Sekiguchi (Victor Invitation)
Recorder, mixer: Masayuki Nakahara (Victor Studio)
Additional engineers: Hirokazu Akashi (Victor Studio), Shigetoshi Saito (Victor Studio)
Mastering engineer: Hiroshi Kawasaki (Victor Studio)
Assistant engineers: Masayuki Oka (Victor Studio), Tomoaki Sato (Victor Vincent), Takashi Kondo (Victor Vincent), Terushi Maruyama (Magnet Studio), Osamu Konishi (Den Music Studio), Akihiro Sano (Studio EGM), Minoru Yasuda (Freedom Studio), Toshio Tanabe (RMC Studio), Shigeru Matsumura (MIT Studio), Satoru Arai (Echo House)
Sound effects: Keishi Urata,  Tsuyoshi Kon, Kunihiko Tominaga, Manabu Ogasawara, Tsutomu Nakayama
Sound adviser: Kazutaka Minemori
Drum tuner: Yukihiro Sugimoto
Adviser: Toshihiro Nara
Art direction & graphic design: Sakaguchi Ken Factory
Design coordinator: Tatsuo Sato
Photography: Bruno Dayan
Hair & make-up: Tetsuya Kameyama
Stylist: Sayuri Chihara
Costumes: Mikako Ohhara
Cover model: Sakuraku K.
Shinya's model: Sayuri Ichiyo
Sugizo's doll: Katan Amano, Ryoichi Yoshida
A & R coordinator: Nobuhiro Sonoyama (Sweet Child)
Artist management: Yoshiki Okiyama (Sweet Child), Masato Takahashi (Sweet Child), Eriko Murata (Sweet Child)
Road crew: Yosuke Narita, Keisuke Takimoto, Jyunzi Sakuma
Official fan club Slave: Orie Murasaki, Naoe Tanimoto
Personnel per album's liner notes.

References 

Luna Sea albums
1992 albums